Erie's collegiate scene is fairly equally split between four-year institutions and two-year business centers. Lake Erie College of Osteopathic Medicine has the largest class of medical students in the country. Penn State Erie is the largest Penn-State branch college. The longest-operating Higher Education provider in the City of Erie is the Erie Business Center, which is a private campus offering 2-year Associate Degrees. Edinboro University of Pennsylvania is the oldest campus in Erie county (about 25 miles south of Erie proper). Edinboro University is a State University, which offers a wide range of various degree programs; including a thriving Arts Department. The following are schools that are located near or around Erie:

References

Education in Erie, Pennsylvania
Universities and colleges in Pennsylvania